Richard Franklin Graf (1863–1940) was an American architect active primarily in Knoxville, Tennessee and the vicinity in the early 20th century.  His works include Stratford Mansion (1910), Sterchi Building (1921), St. John's Lutheran Church (1913), and the Journal Arcade (1924).  His home, the Prairie School-inspired Graf House, is considered Knoxville's first modern home.  Several buildings designed by Graf have been listed on the National Register of Historic Places.

Biography

Graf was born in Nashville, Tennessee in 1863.  His grandfather was one of several families to immigrate from Switzerland to Morgan County in the late 1840s (Morgan County's Swiss immigrants also included the grandparents of one of Graf's future clients, James G. Sterchi).  Graf had relocated to Knoxville by 1884, when he was working at the Burr & Terry Sash Factory in what is now the Old City.

In 1887, Graf cofounded a contracting firm, Vinson and Graf, which operated in Knoxville until 1891.  In the early 1890s, Graf worked as a supervisor for the Knoxville Cabinet and Mantel Company.  In 1894, he joined the firm of noted mail-order architect George Franklin Barber (1854–1915), and was elevated to associate in 1901.  He and Barber were still working together as late as 1907, when they designed a new building for Mechanics' National Bank.

Graf eventually formed an architectural firm with his two sons, John R. Graf and Herbert Graf, as supervising architect.  In 1910, the firm designed an elaborate Neoclassical mansion, Stratford, for James G. Sterchi, as well as two buildings– the Bandstand and the Liberal Arts Building– for the Appalachian Exposition at Chilhowee Park.  Three years later, Graf designed the Gothic-style St. John's Lutheran Church, which still stands across from Old Gray Cemetery on Broadway.

In 1920, Sterchi again commissioned Graf to design his furniture company's 10-story warehouse, now known as Sterchi Lofts, which was completed the following year.  The Graf House, the design of which was inspired by the Prairie School movement, was completed in 1923.   During this same period, Graf designed two dormitories for Maryville College, Carnegie Hall (1917) and Thaw Hall (1923).

Works

The following were designed by Graf or his firm, R.F. Graf and Sons.

See also
Charles I. Barber
Baumann family (architects)
Thomas Hope
Bruce McCarty
Peter Staub

References

External links

People from Nashville, Tennessee
People from Knoxville, Tennessee
Architects from Tennessee
American people of Swiss descent
1940 deaths
1863 births